Anbang (Korean: 안방, Hanja: -房), also known as Anchae (Korean: 안채) is a room in a traditional Korean house (hanok) functioning as the space for the head women of a family. It is considered to be the symbol of the head woman's place in the household.

Meaning
Anbang is literally translated as "inner room" (안, an, "inner, interior";‎ 방(房), bang, "room"). The term is used to refer to the room in a traditional Korean house that is the residence of the head woman of the family or household.

Description
The anbang is the sanctuary for the head woman of the household. The floor of the room is covered with laminate paper covered with bean oil (장판지마감), or a reed mat covering the soil floor of the ondol. There may also be doors leading to the attic on the front part of the kitchen, and the lower part of the floor is covered with a thin blanket. 

On the side of the room or the place farthest away from the heater, cabinets were placed. Cloth hangers were placed on corners of the rooms, and seats were placed for the comfort of the owner. Other furniture, such as desks, may also be present. During winter, a brazier was placed on the center of the room. Frequently, hot iron used for sewing was heated up in the brazier. Folding screens were placed either around the mattress or the windows to keep out the cold. Curtains were also used to stop the cold. On a part of the room, a portable lantern may be placed to be used as a nightlight.

The four walls are all covered in wallpaper. Upper class houses have special wallpapers on the walls. The ceiling is usually covered with a paper wallpaper (종이반자), though there are instances in which the rafters are left exposed. The first layer of the ceiling is covered with scrap paper, the second layer with thicker paper, and the last layer was covered in colored paper from the five colors of the rainbow.

Purpose

The anbang is considered the most closed off room in the house and is placed the furthest from the main gate. People other than the head woman's husband and family are not permitted to enter the anbang without permission. Also, as the space of the head lady of the household, it is used as the center to manage all the housekeeping. It is used to store all the keys and the valuables inside the house. When a bride is introduced inside the house, the previous lady of the house usually moves to another room and leaves the possession of the room to the new woman.

See also
Sarangbang
Hanok

References

Architecture in Korea